The following lists events that happened during 2016 in Libya.

Incumbents
Aguila Saleh Issa, President of the Council of Deputies, 5 August 2014-current
Abdullah al-Thani, Prime Minister, 11 March 2014-current

Events
Libyan Civil War (2014–present)
The Islamic State seized control of Bin Jawad before militants in twelve vehicles attacked the city of Sidra, killing two Petrol Facilities Guard militants in a suicide bomb attack at a checkpoint on 4 January.
At least 65 people were killed on 7 January when a truck bomb hit a police training center in the Libyan town of Zliten.
Afriqiyah Airways Flight 209 is hijacked en route from Sebha to Tripoli and diverted to Malta.

See also

Timeline of Libyan history

References

 
Libya
Years of the 21st century in Libya
2010s in Libya
Libya